General Sir Richard Foster Carter Foster,  (27 January 1879 – 3 April 1965) was a Royal Marines officer who served as Adjutant-General Royal Marines and later as colonel of the East Surrey Regiment.

Biography
Born on 27 January 1879, Foster grew up and was educated at Stubbington House School, a boys' preparatory school near Fareham in Hampshire, where his grandfather and father, and later his brother, served as headmaster. The school specialised in preparing pupils for armed forces officer entrance examinations, particularly for the Royal Navy.

Foster was commissioned into the Royal Marine Artillery in September 1897. In the next few years he held a number posts, including adjutant of the Royal Carmarthen Artillery (Militia) from 1905 to 1908. He attended the army Staff College, Camberley, from 1912 to 1913.

During the First World War Foster held a number of staff appointments, both at home and on the Western Front. He became a temporary lieutenant colonel in September 1915, serving as assistant adjutant and quartermaster general, 63rd (Royal Naval) Division until August 1918 and then assistant quartermaster general, 10th Army Corps until February 1919. For these services he received the Distinguished Service Order in 1918; was made a Companion of the Order of St Michael and St George in June 1919; an officer of the Belgian Order of Leopold with the Croix de Guerre in October 1919 and was four times mentioned in despatches. He then served as assistant quartermaster general of the British Army of the Rhine until April 1923.
 
Foster was assistant adjutant general of the Royal Marines 1928–1930 and colonel commandant of the Royal Marines Chatham Division 1930–1932. Promoted major general in 1932, Foster was appointed Adjutant-General Royal Marines in October 1933, at the time the highest appointment within the Royal Marines. While still adjutant-general, he was promoted to lieutenant general in 1934 and retired from the Royal Marines in October 1936, receiving the rank of full general.

He was made a companion of the Order of the Bath in January 1930, and elevated to Knight Commander of the Order in 1935.

Foster was colonel of the East Surrey Regiment from 1939 to 1946. The 31st Foot, which became part of the East Surrey Regiment in 1881, had been first raised as a regiment of marines and Foster did much to develop the ties between the Royal Marines and the East Surreys. He was also honorary colonel commandant of the Chatham Division of the Royal Marines from 1941 to 1949.

Foster died on 3 April 1966 aged 86. There is a memorial plaque to him in the East Surrey Regiment chapel, All Saints Church, Kingston upon Thames, Surrey.

One of Foster's brothers, Lieutenant Archibald Courtenay Hayes Foster, was killed in action in British East Africa on 20 September 1914.

References

|-

External links
Photograph of Sir Richard Foster held by the National Portrait Gallery, London

1879 births
1965 deaths
Royal Marines personnel of World War I
People educated at Stubbington House School
Companions of the Order of St Michael and St George
Knights Commander of the Order of the Bath
Royal Marines generals
East Surrey Regiment officers
Graduates of the Staff College, Camberley